Hovhannes Erznkatsi ( — John of Erznka or Erzinjan) ( 1230– 1293) was an Armenian scholar and philosopher. He was nicknamed Blouz, probably because of his short stature.

The little that has reached us of his voluminous works reveal an exceptionally gifted scholar, with treasured knowledge of vast scope. Living mostly in the latter part of the thirteenth century, he was also the last of the higher class of the Armenian authors of the ancient and medieval ages. Erznkatsi wrote hymns, commentaries, odes, eulogies, a Martyrology, an astronomical treatise on celestial elements, and a grammar. He was personally known and honored in almost every center of learning in Greater Armenia and Cilicia.

An outstanding orator, he was the main speaker on the occasion of the conferring of knighthood on Hetoum and Thoros, sons of King Leon III, which was celebrated at Sis in 1284. Having studied Latin, apparently at an advanced age, he translated certain parts of the Theology of Thomas Aquinas into Armenian.

References 

 
 Stephen Cushman, Clare Cavanagh, Jahan Ramazani, Paul Rouzer. The Princeton Encyclopedia of Poetry and Poetics: Fourth Edition. — 4. — Princeton University Press, 2012. — P. 83

1250s births
1326 deaths
13th-century Armenian writers
Ethnic Armenian translators
Translators to Armenian
13th-century translators